"Revolution" is a song by Dutch/Moroccan DJ and producer R3HAB, Australian twin sisters NERVO and Dutch/Turkish dance musician Ummet Ozcan. It was released through Spinnin' Records. It peaked at number 37 in the UK Singles Chart.

Music video
A music video to accompany the release of "Revolution" was published to YouTube on 17 December 2013. It was directed by Jaakko Manninen and Hannu Aukia, produced by Sophie McNeil, and plays at a total length of four minutes. As of June 2021, it has over 44 million views.

Track listing

Chart performance

Release history

References

2013 singles
2013 songs
2014 singles
R3hab songs
Nervo (DJs) songs
Songs about revolutions
Song recordings produced by Nervo (DJs)
Songs written by Miriam Nervo
Songs written by Olivia Nervo
Spinnin' Records singles